Kirsty Jane Fenton (born 6 September 2004) is an Australian soccer player who plays for Sydney FC in the A-League Women.

Early life

Fenton grew up in Toronto, New South Wales and attended Hunter Sports High School in Gateshead. She was a member of the Newcastle Jets Academy from the age of 13.

Club career

After featuring for the various Newcastle Jets Youth teams for all of her teenage years Fenton was rewarded with a contract to the first team ahead of the 2021–22 season.

Fenton made her A-League Women debut for the Jets on Matchday One as she started at left back in the absence of the injured Gema Simon. She continued to start for the team and opened the scoring in a 5–1 win over the Wellington Phoenix the following week.

Career statistics

References

Living people
2003 births
Australian women's soccer players
Newcastle Jets FC (A-League Women) players
Women's association football defenders